Chop Chop is a 2001 Danish comedy film. Its original Danish title is Fukssvansen, which literally means "the panel saw". Written and directed by Niels Arden Oplev, the film stars , Anders W. Berthelsen, and Sidse Babett Knudsen, and was produced by Zentropa.

Plot 
Dennis and Carl (Anders W. Berthelsen) are brothers who live on a small farm in the country side. None too bright Dennis wants a girlfriend for Christmas. Carl makes sure that Dennis gets just that when he meets Rita (Sidse Babett Knudsen) at the local pub. She is on the run from her husband and she doesn't turn down the chance to hide away at Carl and Dennis'. One festive evening, aided and abetted by Carl, Dennis and Rita, Finn who also lives at the farmhouse takes a few too many of his home-made acid toffees. And suddenly Carl and Dennis find themselves with a major problem, a girl to manage and some very inquisitive neighbours.

Cast
  as Dennis
 Anders W. Berthelsen as Carl
 Sidse Babett Knudsen as Rita
 Tommy Kenter as Anton
 Birthe Neumann as Elly
 Thomas Bo Larsen as Finn
  as Erwin

Accolades 
At the 55th Bodil Awards, Tommy Kenter won the Best Supporting Actor award and Birthe Neumann was nominated for Best Supporting Actress. At the 2002 Robert Award ceremony, Birthe Neumann won for Best Supporting Actress and Søren Skjær won for Best Production Design, and Kristian Eidnes Andersen was nominated for Best Sound.

References

External links

2001 films
Films directed by Niels Arden Oplev
Zentropa films
2001 comedy films
Danish comedy films